PNS Muhafiz was an Adjutant-class minesweeper  of the Pakistan Navy. It was built by the United States for transfer to Pakistan.

PNS Zulfiqar (K265) of Pakistan was also damaged beyond repair by friendly fire from aircraft of the Pakistan Air Force (PAF) which mistook her for a missile boat of the Indian Navy during the same war. India also lost  in this war.

Operation Trident

During the Indo-Pakistani War of 1971, The minesweeper PNS Muhafiz was tasked to patrol the approaches to port of Karachi. To do so it was deployed on the inner cordon.

Late that evening on 4 December 1971, around 70 miles south of Karachi, the  detected a large Pakistan Navy target, later identified as the Muhafiz on patrol to its north. Veer launched a single SS-N-2 Styx missile on the target, sinking Muhafiz. It was later learned that at 23:30 the Muhafiz was hit by Styx missiles, and sank in the Indian Ocean at about 23:35.

Other vessels of the Indian Navy strike group sank the Pakistan Navy destroyer,  and the merchant ship  (carrying navy personnel and ammunition for Pakistan), and caused irreparable damage to the destroyer .

See also 

 Indo-Pakistani War of 1971
 Timeline of the Bangladesh Liberation War
 Military plans of the Bangladesh Liberation War
 Mitro Bahini order of battle
 Pakistan Army order of battle, December 1971
 Evolution of Pakistan Eastern Command plan
 1971 Bangladesh genocide
 Operation Searchlight
 Indo-Pakistani wars and conflicts
 Military history of India
 List of military disasters
 List of ships sunk by missiles
 List of wars involving India

References

External links
PNS Muhafiz

 

1954 ships
Ships built in Bellingham, Washington
Indo-Pakistani War of 1971
Minesweepers of the Pakistan Navy
Maritime incidents in 1971
Shipwrecks in the Arabian Sea